Bruno Zeltner (born 19 May 1967) is a Swiss sailor. He competed in the men's 470 event at the 1992 Summer Olympics.

References

External links
 

1967 births
Living people
Swiss male sailors (sport)
Olympic sailors of Switzerland
Sailors at the 1992 Summer Olympics – 470
Place of birth missing (living people)
20th-century Swiss people